"Right Here Waiting" is a song by American singer and songwriter Richard Marx. It was released on June 29, 1989, as the second single from his second album, Repeat Offender. The song was a global hit, topping charts in many countries around the world, including the U.S. where it reached number one on the Billboard Hot 100. It reached number two on the UK Singles Chart. It was certified platinum by the Recording Industry Association of America. It was the UK's most streamed love song on Spotify ahead of Valentine's Day in 2013.

The song has been covered by many artists, including Monica for her album The Boy Is Mine.

Background and writing
The song was originally created to be sung by Barbra Streisand but she later refused to sing it. Marx was an aspiring singer/songwriter when Streisand reached out and asked him to write her a hit. Marx sent Streisand "Right Here Waiting", but she turned down the chance to record it.

He said in an interview, “I had just recently written "Right Here Waiting" and it was such a personal song to me at the time that I had no intention of recording it,” he told CBS’s The Talk. “I was like, ‘I’ll give Barbra Streisand "Right Here Waiting"; I’m not gonna do anything with it’. “I had to messenger the cassette tape of it to her. The next day she called me – I still have this voicemail… – and it says, ‘Richard, I heard the song; it’s a beautiful song, but I’m gonna need you to rewrite the lyrics because I’m not gonna be right here waiting for anyone. She actually did me a solid, because had she not rejected it I probably would never have recorded it and every once in a while I put my arm around her and I say, ‘Thank you so much for rejecting my song!'”

"Right Here Waiting", once it was recorded by Marx, reached number one on the Billboard Hot 100 in the summer of 1989.

"Right Here Waiting" was the second single from Repeat Offender, after "Satisfied". Marx wrote the song on the road as a love letter to his wife, the actress Cynthia Rhodes, who was in South Africa shooting a film. The track was arranged by Marx with Jeffery (C.J.) Vanston to feature none of the heavy drums and synthesizers popular at the time, with Marx's vocal accompanied only by classical guitar (by Bruce Gaitsch) and keyboards (by Vanston). It is one of Marx's most frequently covered compositions.

Chart performance
"Right Here Waiting" entered the Billboard Hot 100 singles chart at No. 44 in the week of July 8, 1989, and became Marx's third consecutive number-one single on August 12, 1989. The record spent three consecutive weeks at number one. The song was Marx's first of several to go to number one on the Adult Contemporary chart. Certified platinum on October 16, 1989, "Right Here Waiting" is Marx's best-selling single. The song also reached number one on the Radio & Records CHR/Pop Airplay chart on August 4, 1989, remaining on the top of the chart for three weeks.

In the United Kingdom, the song was released in August 1989 and peaked at No. 2, behind the Italian house song "Ride on Time" by Black Box.

Music video
The video for this song was directed by Jim Yukich, and produced by Paul Flattery. It appears to be filmed on the road during Marx's 1989 Repeat Offender Tour, but was all shot in Los Angeles. It features various black-and-white tour footage interspersed with color scenes of Marx playing the song to an empty auditorium with a grand piano at a (staged) soundcheck. Due to Marx's hectic touring schedule, very little time was available to produce a video for this single, so other tour footage was compiled to make an official video for the track.

Track listings

 7" single
 "Right Here Waiting" — 4:28
 "Wait for the Sunrise" — 4:13

 3" single
 "Right Here Waiting" — 4:28
 "Wait for the Sunrise" — 4:13
 "Hold on to the Nights" (live at the Palace Theatre, Los Angeles, CA) — 4:48

 CD single
 "Right Here Waiting"
 "Hold on to the Nights" (live)
 "That Was Lulu" (live)
 "Wild Life"

 Cassette
 "Right Here Waiting" — 4:28
 "Wait for the Sunrise" — 4:13
 "Right Here Waiting" — 4:28
 "Wait for the Sunrise" — 4:13

Charts and sales

Weekly charts

Year-end charts

All-time charts

Certifications

Credits 
 Richard Marx – vocals 
 C.J. Vanston – keyboards
 Bruce Gaitsch – electric guitar, classical guitar solo

Monica version

"Right Here Waiting" was covered by American R&B singer Monica. It was released only in the United States in December 1999 as the seventh and final single from her second studio album, The Boy Is Mine, and features the R&B group 112. No music video was made for the song.

Charts

See also
List of Hot Adult Contemporary number ones of 1989

References

1989 songs
1989 singles
1990 singles
1999 singles
1980s ballads
112 (band) songs
Arista Records singles
Billboard Hot 100 number-one singles
Cashbox number-one singles
EMI Records singles
Irish Singles Chart number-one singles
Leif Bloms songs
Monica (singer) songs
Number-one singles in Australia
Number-one singles in New Zealand
RPM Top Singles number-one singles
Richard Marx songs
Rock ballads
Songs about loneliness
Songs written by Richard Marx